The 1943 Coupe de France Final was a football match held at Stade Olympique Yves-du-Manoir, Colombes and Parc des Princes, Paris on 9 and 22 May 1943. It saw Olympique de Marseille defeat Girondins ASP 4–0 in the replay thanks to goals by Emmanuel Aznar (2), Georges Dard and Félix Pironti.

Match details

First match

Ahmed Nemeur was not eligible to play the match and the federation gave the cup to Marseille. However, Colonel Joseph Pascot (member of the Commissariat général à l'Éducation générale et sportive) decided that the final had to be played on the field to know the real winner, that is why the final was replayed.

Replay

See also
Coupe de France 1942-1943

External links
Coupe de France results at Rec.Sport.Soccer Statistics Foundation
Report on French federation site

Coupe De France Final
1943
Coupe De France Final 1943
Coupe De France Final 1943
Sport in Hauts-de-Seine
Coupe de France Final
Coupe de France Final